CFTK may refer to:

 CFTK (AM), a radio station (590 AM) licensed to Terrace, British Columbia, Canada
 CFTK-TV, a television station (channel 3) licensed to Terrace, British Columbia, Canada